The lateral surface of an object is all of the sides of the object, excluding its base and top (when they exist). The lateral surface area is the area of the lateral surface. This is to be distinguished from the total surface area, which is the lateral surface area together with the areas of the base and top. 

For a cube the lateral surface area would be the area of the four sides. If the edge of the cube has length , the area of one square face . Thus the lateral surface of a cube will be the area of four faces: . 

More generally, the lateral surface area of a prism is the sum of the areas of the sides of the prism.
This lateral surface area can be calculated by multiplying the perimeter of the base by the height of the prism.

For a right circular cylinder of radius  and height , the lateral area is the area of the side surface of the cylinder: .

For a pyramid, the lateral surface area is the sum of the areas of all of the triangular faces but excluding the area of the base.

References

Further reading
 Lateral surface at Mathwords

Surfaces